The Ernst Strüngmann Institute for Neuroscience in Cooperation with Max Planck Society (ESI) is an independent research institute financed by Andreas and Thomas Strüngmann, German entrepreneurs, and named after their father Dr. Ernst Strüngmann. The ESI is under the scientific governance of the Max Planck Society. It is located in Frankfurt am Main in Hesse. ESI-directors are Scientific Members of the Max Planck Society.
ESI’s mission is to perform excellent fundamental brain research. ESI research focuses on understanding how the many parts of the brain work together to bring about our behaviour.

Development 
In July 2008, a cooperation contract was signed between the Max Planck Society and Drs. Andreas and Thomas Strüngmann to found the ESI as an independent brain research institute with the format of a Max Planck Institute and adhering to the Max Planck excellence principles. On 12 September 2008, the ESI was formally founded, with the legal form of a nonprofit limited liability corporation (“gemeinnützige Gesellschaft mit beschränkter Haftung (gGmbH)”). To finance the ESI, the Strüngmann brothers founded the Ernst Strüngmann Foundation (ESF).
ESI’s founding directors are Wolf Singer and Pascal Fries. Mid July 2009, Prof. Fries became ESI’s first director and thereby ESI’s current managing director. On 1 April 2011, when Prof. Singer assumed emeritus status at the Max Planck Institute for Brain Research, he joined the ESI as Senior Research Group leader. On 1 October 2011, Dr. Ilka Diester joined the ESI as Research Group leader.
2012 Dr. Michael Schmid's independent junior research group that investigates the principles of thalamo-cortical communication for visual perception and attention started at the ESI.

Research 
Research at the ESI aims at understanding how the human brain brings about adaptive behavior, i.e. behavior that is e.g. influenced by previous experience or that weights sensory evidence by its estimated relevance. The respective theoretical concepts like “memory” or “selective attention” are addressed as cognitive functions. Cognitive functions are brought about by the complex interactions among many neurons, neuronal groups, and brain areas. These complex interactions cannot yet be deduced from our understanding of individual neurons. Therefore, a central goal is to understand the principles behind such interactions and how they lead to behavior. Research at the ESI aims at understanding the mechanisms behind the core cognitive functions.

References

External links 
 Homepage of the institute
 Page of the MPG about the institute

Neuroscience research centers in Germany
Max Planck Society